Goo ball may refer to:

 GooBall, a 2005 video game
 Goo ball, a creature of the 2008 video game World of Goo
 Goo balls, a type of cannabis food